Chander Pahar (trans:Mountain of the Moon) (released as Mountains of the Moon in the United States) is a 2013 Indian Bengali-language action-adventure film based on Chander Pahar by Bengali novelist Bibhutibhushan Bandyopadhyay, directed by Kamaleshwar Mukherjee and produced by Mahendra Soni and Shrikant Mohta under the banner of their production house Shree Venkatesh Films. It features Bengali actor Dev in the lead role as Shankar. This is the first collaboration between Dev and Mukherjee, the latter having made only two films before: Uro Chithi and Meghe Dhaka Tara.

Shooting commenced on 20 April 2013. The film released on 20 December 2013. The trailer was released at the Nicco park at 5 pm, on the occasion of Children's Day on 14 November 2013. This is the first Indian film to be extensively shot in South Africa. Chander Pahar is the most successful film in Bengali cinema. Critics consider it Dev's most memorable and recognizable work. It is the first film of the Chander Pahar franchise and was followed by Amazon Obhijaan in 2017. The film went down as the second highest grossing Bengali film of all time, surpassed by the sequel, Amazon Obhijaan.

Plot 

Chander Pahar is the story of a young Bengali man's adventures in Africa from 1909-1910. Shankar Ray Choudhuri is a 20-year-old man, recently completed his First Arts graduation and about to take up a job in a jute mill, a prospect he absolutely loathes.

He yearns for adventure, wildlands, forests and animals. He wants to follow the footsteps of famous explorers like Livingstone, Mungo Park, Marco Polo, all of whom he has read about and idolizes.

By a stroke of luck, he secures a job as a station master in a desolate station in Uganda Railway through a fellow villager working there and goes to Africa without a second thought. One evening Shankar is chased by a man-eating lion and luckily he reaches his cabin and locks the door. The next day he asks the head stationmaster to provide him with a Springfield bolt-action rifle and carbolic acid as a day before he encounters another hazard in Africa: the poisonous black mamba. He miffs the black mamba with his torchlight. The next day he gets these things from another fellow Indian, Tirumal Appa, who is serving the British Army.

They quickly strike a rapport and Tirumal visits him often. One day Tirumal becomes a victim of the same man-eating lion. This rages Shankar and he decides to end this peril. He poses as bait by pouring blood on himself and scatters meat chunks. He tempts the lion out of his cave and eventually shoots him down.

He rescues and looks after the middle-age Portuguese explorer and gold prospector, Diego Alvarez. The encounter with Alavarez influences him deeply. Alavarez tells him of his exploits and adventures, how he and his companion Jim Carter had braved deep jungles and mountains of Richtersveld to find the largest diamond mine. However, they were thwarted by the legendary Bunyip, a mythical monster who guards the mines and killed Carter.

Shankar gives up his job and accompanies Alvarez as he decides to venture out once more and find the mines again. They meet with innumerable hardships. The first is a raging volcano which forces them to halt their expedition. One night they were attacked by the monster Bunyip. Eventually, they get lost in the forests where Alvarez is killed by the monster, in an effort to save Shankar's life. Desolated Shankar mourns the death of Alvarez deeply. He buries him with all rites and sets sail towards the mountain of the moon.

Shankar sets out to reach civilization. He finds the diamond mines by accident. He enters the cave and gets lost. With great difficulty, he gets out, marking his way with "pebbles" and taking some back with him as a memento, not knowing each is an uncut diamond. He finds the remains of the Italian explorer, Attilio Gatti, and learns that the cave he found earlier was the diamond mine. Gatti, as Shankar learns from a note by him, had uncut diamonds in his boots. The note said that whoever reads the note can take the diamonds as long as he buries his skeleton, with Christian rites. Shankar does so and keeps the old diamonds.

While crossing the jungle, he comes in contact with the Bunyip's cave. Filled with revenge, he devises a plan to get rid of Bunyip. Shankar collects sticks from the jungle and sharpens their tips into spears. He fences the entrance with sharpened wood and waits for the Bunyip. The Bunyip turns up and, seeing its prey, jumps at it from a height. Shankar moves out and the Bunyip gets pierced on the wood and dies.

Shankar tries to move out by following the compass. He becomes lost in the deserts of Kalahari and nearly dies of thirst. Fortunately, he is rescued by a survey team and taken to a hospital in Salisbury, Rhodesia. When he recovers he sells four of his diamonds and for much money. One diamond he sends to his parents with a note to sell it and help the villagers with its money. Next, he sells his sole diamond and buys a steamer boat to continue his exploration.

He ends by saying that he will return to that cave one day with a large team and continue the legacy of Alvarez, Carter and Gatti.

Cast 

 Dev as Shankar Ray Choudhuri, the protagonist
 Gérard Rudolf as Diego Alvarez
 Martin Cito Otto as Jim Carter
 Nabeel Khan as Tirumal Appa
 Paul Ditchfield as Jacobus Marius
 Andrew Stock as Attilio Gatti
 Laboni Sarkar as Shankar's mother
 Tamal Roy Chowdhury as Shankar's father
 David James as Albuquerque
 Peter Moruakgomo as Zulu Chief
 Matthew Monika as Zulu King
 Rafiq Jibhay as Patel
 Keith Gendagoo as Prasad Das
 Luthuli Dlamini as Dan Mabiru
 Ramambila Muladelo as Masai Chief
 Debika Mitra as Shankar's relative (special appearance)

Production

Development 

Director Kamaleshwar Mukherjee mentioned Chander Pahar as his "dream project". But he even compared the project to a "double-edged sword" as he realised the challenges while looking for locations in South Africa for a month. When Shree Venkatesh Films agreed to produce the film, they wanted a big star in the lead. As a result, it was decided that actor Dev would play the role of Shankar.

For this very special project, Kamaleshwar has a Maasai proverb in mind: "If you are not living on the edge, you are taking up too much space." He added that he was lucky enough as Bibhutibhushan Bandyopadhyay, author of Chander Pahar, had such a fertile imagination that, without having visited Africa, he had a clear idea about the landscape. Even Dev said that the shooting of Chander Pahar was going to be the most exciting few days of his life.

Casting 
A source close to the Chander Pahar unit revealed that the production house wanted a big star to play Shankar, the adventurer protagonist. At the beginning, Dev and Parambrata's names had come up. However, Kamaleshwar Mukherjee later said that Dev was in his and the producer's (Shree Venkatesh Films) minds from the beginning. They needed an athletic body for the role of Shankar because in the book it is mentioned that Shankar was into boxing and he knew horse riding and swimming. Dev was learning horse riding and he is good at action scenes. Therefore, finally, he was chosen to be cast as Shankar. Dev also agreed to do that as he was brought the offer. But he was asked to lose weight because, in the latter part of the film, Shankar fights with lions, walks through jungles and mountains, and almost starves. Regarding the character, Dev said, "Shankar, the protagonist, was an athlete and a boxer. He never flinches from any challenge or danger. Be it fighting the African lion or duelling on the cliff, and that too without a body double."

Most of the cast members of Chander Pahar are from South Africa. It took a lot of time to decide who was going to play the role of Diego Alvarez, the Portuguese explorer, who has a supporting role. It was later disclosed that, among others, South African actor Gérard Rudolf has been assigned the role of Alvarez. He even has a dialogue in Bengali, where he tells Shankar, "Ishwar Tomar Mongol Korun" (meaning, God Bless You).

Kamaleshwar Mukherjee said that he was sending a translated version of the script to the actors and added that, they were so professional that they had already read up about Chander Pahar on the Internet.

Budget 

The budget of Chander Pahar was the highest in Bengali Cinema till its release in 2013. The film is produced by Shree Venkatesh Films and is shot at locations in Africa. It was reportedly being made with a budget of nearly  — making it one of the most expensive in the Bengali film industry. The film would reportedly incorporate computer-generated imagery and visual effects at par with Hollywood and Bollywood standards.

For Shree Venkatesh Films, Chander Pahar marked the latest in a series of adventure films. According to The Times of India, it will be high-budget and have computer graphics that no one has seen before in a Bengali film. It was also reported that the production costs suddenly went up by  more than that was estimated, during the second schedule of filming.

Filming 

Chander Pahar was filmed for 45 days in South Africa. Before the filming, Kamaleshwar Mukherjee threw a party on 31 March 2013 at Kolkata, much before 20 April, the day when shooting was scheduled to start. Upon questioning, he said, "Before the shooting of the film which contains a large number of risks, team Chander Pahar wanted a party with the presence of all the crew and artists. Who knows if anyone doesn't come back forever! Everyone's life is at stake."

It was the first time in Bengali cinema that a film is made with so much of risks and challenges. Dev said, "Chander Pahar is going to be the biggest challenge in my life and I'm not afraid. Being afraid will mean no shooting for the project."

Sequence with African lions 

Chander Pahar has of a sequence in which six African lions chase Dev. Though a lot of scenes involve risks, the crew was very tense about this particular scene. The chase sequence was filmed at an animal farm for three days. During this scene, the director and cinematographer stayed in an open cage with three sides closed. The distance between Dev and the lions was measured by the examiner of the lions. Pieces of meat were used to tempt them. Dev had to run as the director said "Action", with six lions chasing him. Then he had to enter the cage while running and the opening of the cage was shut immediately. According to the director Kamaleshwar Mukherjee, lions are very lazy and don't even get up for four days after having a meal. The lions used were not given food for three days. After this shot, Dev said, "During my shoot with the lion, I went closer than what director Kamaleswar Mukhopadhyay had wanted. And he reprimanded me on this count."

Sequence with Black mamba 

The novel Chander Pahar has a story where the protagonist Shankar has a face-to-face experience with Africa's most deadliest snake, Black mamba. The shooting included a real Black mamba. Director Kamaleshwar Mukherjee said that the local people were telling the pre-production team how the Black mamba had bitten at least someone of the crew of a film in 80% of shooting cases. The most threatening fact was that the venom of Black mamba cannot be taken out. Thus, the shooting of Chander Pahar has a life-threatening sequence with a venomous snake. Mukherjee added that the largest risk in this sequence will be of the cinematographer, Soumik Haldar, who confidently said that he will be positively doing his work since he had already decided to do that. It was later revealed that to prevent risk, a glass sheet was over the snake and the camera so that, if the snake attacks, the sheet will be dropped.

Shooting spot 

There were life-threatening risks with the other 35 artists. The grassland, where the shooting took place is very dangerous, is full of snakes; most of the crew was afraid. Abhishek Daga, the executive producer said that carbolic acid will be used where the shooting will take place, and everyone will wear ankle-high boots. Also, during the chase sequence with the lions, the entire shooting spot will be fenced with electric fences so that giraffes or deer don't enter the set as that can prove dangerous.

Small base camps were made for the shooting, where the crew members stayed. They were surrounded by electric fences because lions may destroy them if angry and it has occurred before. Other than lions and Black mamba, shooting featured other wild animals such as Python, hyena, crocodile, cheetah, hippopotamus, Puff adder, viper and wild scorpions, some of which are extremely venomous. "Every animal will be shot real and alive with no use of computer graphics!" said Dev.

A 22-year-old Bengali boy named Sundar trained the hyenas. There is so much risk in the shooting that the crew is bound to keep mobile phones and ambulances so that they can be taken to a hospital. Even it is said that helicopters would be kept so that no time is wasted.

Sequence with African elephants 

The film had featured a chase sequence with six African elephants. "The local people said that the sequence with African elephants is even riskier than those with African lions and Black mamba. If the elephants somehow get angry, no one will return alive!" said Kamaleshwar Mukherjee. The favorite thing about African elephants is oranges: Oranges were thrown towards the sky from a distance to attract their attention. As the elephants will run to get the oranges, Dev has to run preceding them. Kamaleshwar added, "The local stuntmen assured us that there is nothing to fear. Once they raise their hands and tell the elephants to stop, the herd of elephants will stop immediately."

Other risks 

There were other scenes regarding which the crew members were worried initially. The production team said that the place in the Kalahari Desert where the film was shot is nearly 300 km from their hotel; the team had to cover 600 km regularly during the shoot. "The most dangerous thing is that we have to return to the presence of daylight. Otherwise, we cannot return once there is darkness over the red desert. The place is so impassable that there is no sign of roads. We will get lost. Over that, the day temperature there is 50 degrees. And the night temperature is 4 degrees," said Kamaleshwar Mukherjee before the filming.

Other than the Kalahari Desert part, the film features actor Dev in a rock climbing sequence. It was shot at such a mountain that, if one fell, he would go down 500 feet. There is also a sequence of Dev inside an old cave with a Python.

It was reported that the Chander Pahar team had to face a Mozambique spitting cobra while shooting a scene.

Other precautions 

 Use of sunglasses, deodorant, and aftershave was strictly prohibited at shooting as it may disturb the wild animals.
 Smoking is strictly prohibited as a preventive to forest fires.
 The weight of the lions will be over 150 kg and their height will be 3 feet.
 No wild animal can be used for shooting for over 2 hours.
 Eating any sorts of non-veg food items and even using tomato sauce is forbidden as their scent may distract the wild animals.
 Electric fences should surround every shooting location.
 Carbolic acid should be used in every shooting location to prevent the entry of snakes.
 The film used original models of weapons like Springfield Bolt Action, Winchester Repeater, Gewehr 88 Mauser, Colt Six Shooter, boot knives and axe, among others.

Locations 

For the filming of Chander Pahar, the team camped at places in South Africa for a month. Some places near Johannesburg were finalised. Other places where filming took place include the jungles of Mpumalanga, Elands River valley, Blyde River Canyon, Kruger National Park, mountains of Drakensberg and the Kalahari Desert. The film was also shot in Kenya and Uganda. Locations within West Bengal include Bolpur, where the portions of Shankar's village and home were shot.

Director Kamaleshwar Mukherjee said,

"Near Johannesburg and the province of Mpumalanga, there are forests, streams and game parks that are quite spectacular, which would be great on screen. Once we'd decided on the locations in and around Kruger National Park, my directorial team set out for the mountains of Drakensberg and the deserts of Kalahari. Drakensberg has numerous valleys, water bodies and trails that could serve for the famous Richtersveld Mountains described in the novel. The Sentinel peak and KwaZulu-Natal offer brilliant vistas, but visually, the Kalahari is the most stunning. Like all deserts, the temperature varies from 51° Celsius in the day to 5° Celsius in the evening. About 17 years ago, an Italian film was shot there and since then the furious desert hasn't witnessed a camera. There is one single lodging facility about three hours away from the core area. But we will shoot there anyway."

Tribes 

A number of tribes of Africa are shown in this film: Swahilis, Somalis, Maasais, Matabeles and Zulus.

Visual effects 

Some special scenes were made with the help of computer graphics. The most notable of these is the eruption of the volcano and the sequence featuring the monster called Bunyip.

Soundtrack 
Initially, composer Debojyoti Mishra, who had earlier worked in Kamaleshwar Mukherjee's Uro Chithi and Meghe Dhaka Tara was signed to compose the film score for Chander Pahar. But just before a few days of the film's release, he was replaced by Indraadip Das Gupta. Producer Shrikant Mohta stated the reason that Debojyoti's music didn't quite suit the film well and that's why they were bound to approach Indraadip.

According to Indraadip, the producers did approach him and asked him that how long he would take to compose the film score for a film, to which he replied that it could be done in 4 days. He added, "Then, I was asked to work on Chander Pahar. I was astounded since it's a big-canvas story. While Mishawr Rawhoshyo was quite a challenge, this is an even bigger task. I will have to work on the background score and the title track apart from a few other pieces of music. I spoke to my team and they gave their nod. I'll have to work extra hard to complete the score as the film's release is nearing."

Release

Marketing

First look and trailer

Though by early 2013, the production house had yet not released any official poster of Chander Pahar, a large number of unofficial posters designed by graphic designers were promoted in social networking sites such as Facebook and Twitter, featuring only Dev in the foreground and background somewhat similar to the official cover art of the novel. It was later found out that some of these were unofficial versions and morphed screenshots from the 2011 Australian movie The Hunter. 

On 14 November 2013, during the occasion of Children's Day, the first theatrical trailer of the film was released by Shree Venkatesh Films, at the Kolkata Nicco park. Upon its release, the trailer went viral on the web and managed to receive 32,000+ viewers on YouTube on the first day itself. Soon, the trailer got 100,000+ viewers in just 3 days, which was the first for any Bengali film.

Apart from these, back to back episodes were released by Shree Venkatesh Films at their official YouTube channel for promotion, under the name of 'Chander Pahar Diaries', which provided various glimpses of the filming:

Reception

Box office
Chander Pahar was released on 20 December 2013 along with the challenge of Dhoom 3. As it is a festival time release, Chander Pahar beat Dhoom 3 in Kolkata. It had a collection of 4.83 crore in the first week. The film completed 100 days in Bengal Box Office.

Awards and nominations

Sequel

A sequel Amazon Obhijaan was released on 22 December 2017.

See also 
 List of highest-grossing Bengali films
 Dev (Bengali actor)

References

External links 

 
 

2013 films
Indian action adventure films
Harare in fiction
Films scored by Indradeep Dasgupta 
Films scored by Debojyoti Mishra
Films set in Uganda
Films set in Rhodesia
Films directed by Kamaleshwar Mukherjee
Films shot in South Africa
Bengali-language Indian films
2010s Bengali-language films
2010s action adventure films
Indian children's films
Films based on Indian novels
Films set in 1909
Films set in 1910
Films based on works by Bibhutibhushan Bandyopadhyay